Dai Roberts is a British sculptor, print and installation artist. He taught at Coventry University, and was teaching at Richmond University in 2011.

References

Further reading 
The Marmite Painting Prize
Braziers International Artists Workshop
Rojaraku Spatial Art Laboratory
Noon Day Demons

External links
 

Alumni of Nottingham Trent University
British sculptors
British male sculptors
Living people
Academics of Coventry University
Year of birth missing (living people)